Manhattan Love Story is an American romantic comedy television series created by Jeff Lowell, who also served as an executive producer alongside Peter Traugott, Robin Schwartz, Rachel Kaplan, and Jon Liebman for ABC Studios. The series aired on ABC from September 30 to October 21, 2014, airing at 8:30 pm (Eastern). Following modest viewership, the series' cancellation was announced on October 24: the first from network television for the fall schedule and for the 2014–15 season overall.

The series aired online in New Zealand on TVNZ's on-demand service from October 1, 2014, prior to an intended airing on TV2 in 2015. Following the series' cancellation by ABC, TVNZ continued to release the remaining episodes. It was announced on November 25, 2014, that the remaining episodes that were unaired by ABC would be released in the United States on Hulu and WatchABC.com on a weekly basis beginning on December 2, 2014. On December 4, 2014, all seven remaining episodes were released simultaneously on Hulu and WatchABC.com, with non-subscriber availability a week later. As a result, episodes 10 and 11 were released on Hulu before their release on TVNZ OnDemand.

Synopsis
The series chronicles the journey of a new couple and the questions they are thinking from the moment they begin their relationship.

Cast and characters

Main
 Lio Tipton as Dana Hopkins, a young woman from a small town living in New York, determined to succeed in both business and love
 Jake McDorman as Peter Cooper, a native New Yorker who tends to date his way throughout the city
 Nicolas Wright as David Cooper, Peter's brother and Amy's husband, who loves his wife and money, even if she is the one who must manage it
 Jade Catta-Preta as Amy Cooper, David's wife and Dana's sorority sister
 Chloé Wepper as Chloe Cooper, Peter and David's half-sister
 Kurt Fuller as William Cooper, Peter, David, and Chloe's father, who owns the company at which his children work

Recurring
 Nico Evers-Swindell as Tucker, Dana's boss at the publishing house she works at as an editor

Reception
Manhattan Love Story received generally negative reviews from critics. Rotten Tomatoes gave the series a rating of 28%, based on 43 reviews, with an average rating of 4.8/10. The site's consensus read, "Saddled with a worn setup and offensively bad jokes, Manhattan Love Story isn't very lovable." Metacritic gave the show a score of 42 out of 100, based on reviews from 24 critics, indicating "mixed or average reviews".

Episodes

International broadcast
In New Zealand, the series was released online on TVNZ OnDemand, starting October 1, 2014, which included the episodes unaired by ABC. The release of episodes 5 through 9 was the first public release of the episodes.

The show began airing in Spain on November 23, 2014.

The show began airing Sunday nights on Sony Channel (Asia) on October 19, 2014.

M-Net has also aired the show in Africa.

In Australia, the series premiered from August 26, 2015, on the Seven Network at 1:30am.

In India, the Murdoch-owned Star World channel premiered the show for weekday runs starting 13 October 2015, sandwiched between Modern Family (reruns) and latest season of Masterchef Australia in primetime.

Notes

References

External links
 
 

2010s American romantic comedy television series
2010s American single-camera sitcoms
2014 American television series debuts
2014 American television series endings
American Broadcasting Company original programming
English-language television shows
Nonlinear narrative television series
Television series by ABC Studios
Television shows filmed in New York City
Television shows set in Manhattan